Jaiman Lowe (born 22 January 1983 in Toowoomba, Queensland) is an Australian former professional rugby league footballer who last played for the Melbourne Storm in the National Rugby League (NRL). He has previously played for the North Queensland Cowboys and the South Sydney Rabbitohs. His usual position is at Prop Forward. Jaiman played alongside his younger brother, South Sydney forward Ben Lowe.

Early life
Born in Toowoomba, Queensland Jaiman is the brother of Ben. He was educated at St Mary's College, Toowoomba

Playing career
In 2002, Lowe made his first grade debut for the North Queensland Cowboys in a match against the South Sydney Rabbitohs. In 2006, he signed and played with South Sydney until he was released from contract in 2009. 

At the start of 2010 he joined the Queensland Cup side Northern Pride RLFC, but was re-signed mid-season to the South Sydney Rabbitohs to replace Ben Ross, who was ruled out of the season due to a neck injury.  Along with his playing time for Souths, Lowe also played 27 matches for North Sydney in the NSW Cup.

Lowe signed with the Melbourne Storm for the 2011 NRL season.  He played interchange in Storm's 2012 Premiership win over Canterbury-Bankstown.

Achievements and accolades

Team
2012 NRL Grand Final: Melbourne Storm – Winners

External links
Player stats

References 

1983 births
Living people
Australian rugby league players
Melbourne Storm players
North Queensland Cowboys players
North Sydney Bears NSW Cup players
Northern Pride RLFC players
Rugby league players from Toowoomba
Rugby league props
South Sydney Rabbitohs players